Classic Sinatra: His Great Performances 1953–1960 is a 2000 compilation album by Frank Sinatra, containing twenty tracks he recorded for Capitol Records.

Track listing
 "I've Got the World on a String" (Harold Arlen, Ted Koehler) - 2:10
 "I Get a Kick Out of You" (Cole Porter) - 2:54
 "They Can't Take That Away from Me" (George Gershwin, Ira Gershwin) - 1:58
 "My Funny Valentine" (Richard Rodgers, Lorenz Hart) - 2:31
 "Young at Heart" (Carolyn Leigh, Johnny Richards) - 2:51
 "Someone to Watch Over Me" (G. Gershwin, I. Gershwin) - 2:56
 "In the Wee Small Hours of the Morning" (David Mann, Bob Hilliard) - 3:01
 "I've Got You Under My Skin" (Porter) - 3:43
 "You Make Me Feel So Young" (Josef Myrow, Mack Gordon) - 2:56
 "It Happened in Monterey" (Mabel Wayne, Billy Rose) - 2:36
 "Oh! Look at Me Now" (Joe Bushkin, John DeVries) - 2:49
 "Night and Day" (Porter) - 4:00
 "Witchcraft" (Cy Coleman, Leigh) - 2:53
 "The Lady Is a Tramp" (Rodgers, Hart) - 3:16
 "All the Way" (Sammy Cahn, Jimmy Van Heusen) - 2:53
 "Come Fly with Me" (Cahn, Van Heusen) - 3:18
 "Put Your Dreams Away (For Another Day)" (Paul Mann, Stephen Weiss, Ruth Lowe) - 3:13
 "One for My Baby (and One More for the Road)" (Arlen, Johnny Mercer) - 4:26
 "Come Dance with Me" (Cahn, Van Heusen) - 2:31
 "Nice 'N' Easy" (Alan Bergman, Marilyn Bergman, Lew Spence) - 2:44

Personnel
 Frank Sinatra - vocals
 Nelson Riddle - arranger, conductor
 Billy May
 Bill Miller - pianist

Certifications

References

2000 compilation albums
Frank Sinatra compilation albums
Compilation albums published posthumously